The Rally Chile is a Chilean rally competition based in Concepción and held throughout the Biobío region of Chile. It was first held in 2018 when it was run as a candidate event as part of a bid to join the World Rally Championship schedule. The candidate event was deemed successful and the rally was added to the 2019 calendar. The rally made Chile the thirty-second country to host the WRC since the championship was launched in 1973.

Winners

References

External links
  

 
2019 establishments in Chile
Recurring sporting events established in 2019
Chile